Kanji is a fermented drink, originating from the Indian subcontinent, made in India for the festival of Holi.

Kanji is made with water, black carrots, beetroot, mustard seeds and heeng. It may be served with boondi sprinkled on top.

Nutritionally, kanji is high in antioxidants. Eleven strains of probiotic bacteria have been isolated from kanji, with the strain Pediococcus acidilactici genotypically characterised with high growth potential.

See also
 List of Indian beverages
Şalgam

References

Indian drinks
Holi
Uttar Pradeshi cuisine